The fourth inauguration of Ferdinand Marcos as the tenth President of the Philippines took place on February 25, 1986, at Malacañang Palace in Manila. The inauguration marked the commencement of the fourth term (and final term) of Ferdinand Marcos as President. Marcos eventually stepped down as President a few hours later while the 3-day mass demonstrations were taking place.

Presidency of Ferdinand Marcos
Marcos 4
1986 in the Philippines
Malacañang Palace